Haw River State Park is a  North Carolina state park in Guilford and Rockingham Counties, North Carolina in the United States.  As one of the newest state parks in North Carolina, Haw River has limited recreational opportunities.  Haw River State Park currently houses the Summit Environmental Education Center and is located off North Carolina Highway 150 in Browns Summit.

Environmental education

Environmental education is the central focus at Haw River State Park. The Summit Environmental Education Center is a retreat and educational facility operated by the North Carolina Division of Parks and Recreation. It was formerly a retreat center owned and operated by the Episcopal Diocese of North Carolina, who sold the property to the state. The center can house up to 180 overnight visitors in a motel and several dormitories. There are eight conference rooms, a cafeteria and indoor and outdoor recreational facilities with a six acre (0.02 km²) lake and hiking trails.

The Summit Environmental Education Center is used to educate employees of the state of North Carolina including park rangers and public school teachers. When the facilities are not in use by a state organization outside organizations may use the facilities for staff retreats, family reunions and business conferences.

Nearby state parks
The following state parks are within  of Haw River State Park:
Hanging Rock State Park
Mayo River State Park

References

External links
 

State parks of North Carolina
Protected areas of Guilford County, North Carolina
Protected areas of Rockingham County, North Carolina
Protected areas established in 2003
2003 establishments in North Carolina